Pedro Mosquera Parada (born 21 April 1988) is a Spanish professional footballer who plays for AD Alcorcón mainly as a defensive midfielder.

Career
Born in A Coruña, Galicia, Mosquera played roller hockey for his high school team in neighbouring Santa María del Mar. In 2000, at the age of 12, he arrived in Real Madrid's youth system. He started out as a professional in 2006–07's Segunda División – four games, 84 minutes and relegation.

On 24 January 2010, Mosquera was called to the first team for a match against Málaga CF, but did not leave the bench. Two months and one day later he made his La Liga debut, playing one minute in a 4–2 away win over Getafe CF after replacing Xabi Alonso.

Mosquera signed precisely with Getafe on 12 July 2010, penning a five-year contract and reuniting with former Real Madrid Castilla coach Míchel. He made his debut for the club 16 days later, scoring against Germany's VfL Osnabrück in a friendly.

On 20 January 2012, after not playing one single minute under new manager Luis García in the season, Mosquera agreed to return to Castilla, with the side in the Segunda División B. In summer 2014, after a further top-flight campaign with Getafe, he joined Elche CF of the same league on a three-year contract. He scored his first goal in the Spanish top tier on 14 September while at the service of the latter, contributing to a 3–2 away victory over Rayo Vallecano.

Mosquera cut ties with the Valencians on 27 July 2015, and signed a four-year deal with Deportivo de La Coruña hours later. He played 37 matches in his first season, helping to a final 15th position in the table.

On 2 August 2019, Mosquera terminated his contract at the Estadio Riazor and joined SD Huesca for two years the following day. During his spell in Aragon, he totalled 100 appearances.

On 8 July 2022, Mosquera moved to Primera Federación club AD Alcorcón.

Career statistics

Honours
Real Madrid Castilla
Segunda División B: 2011–12

Huesca
Segunda División: 2019–20

References

External links

1988 births
Living people
Spanish footballers
Footballers from A Coruña
Association football midfielders
La Liga players
Segunda División players
Segunda División B players
Primera Federación players
Real Madrid C footballers
Real Madrid Castilla footballers
Real Madrid CF players
Getafe CF footballers
Elche CF players
Deportivo de La Coruña players
SD Huesca footballers
AD Alcorcón footballers
Spain youth international footballers